Yves Simon may refer to:
 Yves Simon (philosopher)
 Yves Simon (singer)